Julio García or Julio Garcia may refer to:

Sports
 Julio César García (born 1987), Mexican boxer
 Julio García (Peruvian footballer) (born 1981), Peruvian football player
 Julio Garcia (Mexican footballer) (born 1989), Mexican football player with the San Antonio Scorpions
 Julio García Fernández (born 1965), Spanish football player
 Julio García Fernández de los Ríos (1894–1969), Spanish equestrian and Olympic medalist
 Julio García, Chilean soccer team manager for Club Provincial Curicó Unido in the 1990s

Other
 Julio Acosta García (1872–1954), a president of Costa Rica
 Don Julio García Agapito (c. 1964–2008), Peruvian environmentalist 
 Julio García, a Governor of Colima in the 1860s
 Julio García Espinosa (1926–2016), Cuban film director